Steven Douglas Hill (born March 14, 1985) is an American former professional baseball catcher and first baseman who played in Major League Baseball (MLB) for the St. Louis Cardinals.

Career history
Hill played college baseball for Stephen F. Austin University, Eastfield College, Mt. San Jacinto College, and San Jacinto College-North before being selected by the Cardinals in the 13th Round (412nd overall) of the 2007 amateur entry draft. Hill played for the Class AA Springfield Cardinals before bypassing the Cardinals Class AAA Memphis Redbirds farm team when he was called up to the major league Cardinals on August 11, 2010. He made his debut on Aug 15 at Busch Stadium, and hit a home run for his first major league hit. He was recalled on September 24 after Yadier Molina was shut down for the season.

2012
Hills contract at AAA-Memphis was purchased by the St. Louis Cardinals and he was recalled on May 23, 2012. He had two different stints with St. Louis during the season, but saw limited playing time with only ten at-bats, going 2-for-10. He played in 87 minor-league games for Memphis batting .266 with 17 home runs and 52 RBIs.  In November 2012 Steven Hill, along with two other players was outrighted back to Memphis as St. Louis cleared space on their 40-man off-season roster for possible trades and acquisitions.  Hill was claimed by the Oakland Athletics during the Triple-A portion of the 2012 Rule 5 draft. Hill announced his retirement on April 2, 2013.

References

External links

MiLB.com player profile
Hill player profile page at Scout.com

1985 births
Living people
Baseball players from Texas
Major League Baseball catchers
St. Louis Cardinals players
Batavia Muckdogs players
Eastfield Harvesters baseball players
Swing of the Quad Cities players
Palm Beach Cardinals players
Springfield Cardinals players
Stephen F. Austin Lumberjacks baseball players
Gulf Coast Cardinals players
Memphis Redbirds players
Mt. San Jacinto Eagles baseball players